Marianne Scharwenka  (née Stresow, February 25, 1856 – October 24, 1918, Berlin) was a German violinist and composer. She was married to the German composer Philipp Scharwenka.

External links 
 Marianne Scharwenka's Autograph Collection – 19th/20th – a set on Flickr at www.flickr.com Marianne Scharwenka's collection of autographs from the 19th & 20th century.
 Detailed biography of Marianne Scharwenka (in German)

1856 births
1918 deaths
Musicians from Berlin
People from the Province of Brandenburg
German classical violinists
19th-century German musicians
Women classical violinists